L'Ange-Gardien is a municipality in the Capitale-Nationale region of Quebec, Canada. It is part of La Côte-de-Beaupré Regional County Municipality.

L'Ange-Gardien changed status from parish municipality to ordinary municipality on May 17, 2007.

Demographics
Population trend:
 Population in 2011: 3634 (2006 to 2011 population change: 20.8%)
 Population in 2006: 3008
 Population in 2001: 2815
 Population in 1996: 2841
 Population in 1991: 2819

Private dwellings occupied by usual residents: 1,459 (total dwellings: 1,534)

Mother tongue:
 English as first language: 1.7%
 French as first language: 97.5%
 English and French as first language: 0%
 Other as first language: 0.8%

See also
Chenal de l'Île d'Orléans
Rivière la Retenue
Rivière du Petit Pré
Ferrée River (Montmorency River tributary)
St. Lawrence river
List of municipalities in Quebec

References

External links

Incorporated places in Capitale-Nationale
Municipalities in Quebec